John Welch was a British colonial governor. He was Deputy Governor of Anguilla from 1749 until 1750.

References

Deputy Governors of Anguilla